Elachista grotenfelti is a moth species of the family Elachistidae. It is found in Bulgaria, Greece and Turkey.

The forewing ground colour varies from snow white to yellowish white. The hindwings vary from yellowish white to grey.

References

grotenfelti
Moths described in 2012
Moths of Europe